Baltic is the town center village of the town of Sprague, Connecticut, and a census-designated place (CDP). The population of the CDP was 1,250 as of the 2010 census. The Sprague town hall is in Baltic.  The Baltic Historic District is a historic district that was listed on the National Register of Historic Places in 1987, encompassing virtually the entire extent of the village.

History
Baltic was formed around a cotton mill established on the Shetucket River on land purchased in 1856 by former Rhode Island Governor and U.S. Senator William Sprague III. The A. & W. Sprague Manufacturing Co. mill burned down in 1887. Subsequently, Frederick Sayles of Pawtucket, Rhode Island, purchased the site and built the Baltic Mills Co. cotton mill, which opened in 1899. The company operated until 1963, when the mill was sold to a syndicate from New York. The mill continued operating until 1967, when it was closed and the property and equipment were sold. In 1970 the property was sold to the Casper Division of Bevis Industries, which used it for a mail order operation.

The historic district includes 208 contributing buildings and two other contributing structures over a  area.

In August 1999, the remains of the mill were destroyed by fire. There was only one building that survived although it was also critically damaged
. It was soon after discovered that campus was set ablaze by three local boys.

On April 23, 2018, the mill was set on fire again. Fire officials said hot sparks hit debris from citing pipes, likely sparking the flames of the fire.

Demographics
As of the 2010 census the Baltic CDP had a population of 1,250.  The racial composition of Baltic was 81.0% white, 3.7% black or African American, 1.6% Native American, 2.6% Asian, 0.1% Pacific Islander, 5.4% from some other race and 5.7% from two or more races.  8.7% of the population was Hispanic or Latino of any race.

Events
Baltic is the site of a monthly Sprague River Run on the Shetucket River from April to October, which includes tubing and activities for children and adults.

See also
National Register of Historic Places listings in New London County, Connecticut

References

Census-designated places in New London County, Connecticut
Queen Anne architecture in Connecticut
Villages in Connecticut
Historic districts in New London County, Connecticut
Sprague, Connecticut
Populated places established in 1856
Villages in New London County, Connecticut
Census-designated places in Connecticut